The Keith House is a historic house at 2200 Broadway in Little Rock, Arkansas.  It is a two-story brick structure, three bays wide, with a side-gable roof.  A single-story gabled porch projects from the center of the main facade, supported by brick piers, with exposed rafter ends and large Craftsman brackets.  The house was designed by noted Arkansas architect Charles L. Thompson and built in 1912.  It is a particularly well-executed combination of Craftsman and Prairie School features.

The house was listed on the National Register of Historic Places in 1982.

See also
National Register of Historic Places listings in Little Rock, Arkansas

References

Houses on the National Register of Historic Places in Arkansas
Prairie School architecture in Arkansas
Houses completed in 1912
Houses in Little Rock, Arkansas
1912 establishments in Arkansas
National Register of Historic Places in Little Rock, Arkansas
Historic district contributing properties in Arkansas